Janssen is a Dutch patronymic surname cognate to the English surname Johnson. It is the 7th most common name in the Netherlands and the most common (over 131,000 people), when combined with the spelling variant Jansen.

Geographical distribution
As of 2014, 45.3% of all known bearers of the surname Janssen were residents of the Netherlands (frequency 1:281), 26.9% of Germany (1:2,249), 11.5% of the United States (1:23,667), 9.4% of Belgium (1:926), 1.4% of Australia (1:12,720) and 1.2% of Canada (1:23,187).

In the Netherlands, the frequency of the surname was higher than national average (1:281) in the following provinces:
 1. Limburg (1:68)
 2. Gelderland (1:141)
 3. North Brabant (1:208)

In Belgium, the frequency of the surname was higher than national average (1:926) only in one region: Flemish Region (1:696).

In Germany, the frequency of the surname was higher than national average (1:2,249) in the following states:
 1. Lower Saxony (1:405)
 2. Bremen (1:927)
 3, North Rhine-Westphalia (1:1,736)
 4. Hamburg (1:2,074)

People
Abraham Janssen (c. 1699–1765),  British baronet politician, son of Theodore Janssen
Abraham Janssen (chessplayer)  (1720–1795), British chess player
Albert-Édouard Janssen (1883–1966), Belgian monetary theorist and Minister of State
Anton Janssen (born 1963), Dutch footballer
Arnold Janssen (1837–1909), German-Dutch Roman Catholic priest, missionary and saint
Ben Janssen, Dutch heavy metal guitarist
Benno Janssen (1874–1964), American architect
Benny Janssen (born c. 1960), Dutch sidecarcross rider
Brian Janssen  (born 1962), Australian boxer
Bryan Janssen (born 1995), Dutch football goalkeeper
Cam Janssen (born 1984), American ice hockey player 
Camille Janssen (1837–1926), Belgian Governor-General of the (Congo 1886–1892)
Casey Janssen (born 1981), American baseball player for the Washington Nationals
Charles-Emmanuel Janssen (1907–1986), Belgian businessman and politician, son of Emmanuel Janssen
Charlie Janssen (born 1971), American politician
Constant Janssen (1895–1970), Belgian physician and founder of the predecessor of Janssen Pharmaceutica
David Janssen (1931–1980), American actor
Dennis Janssen (born 1992), Dutch footballer
Diego Janssen (born 1981), Uruguayan guitarist and composer
Dirk Janssen (1881–1986), Dutch gymnast
Dominique Janssen (born 1995), Dutch football defender
Edward H. Janssen (1815–1877), German-born American politician; Treasurer of Wisconsin (1852–1856)
Eilene Janssen (born 1938), American film and television actress
Emmanuel Janssen (1879–1955), Belgian businessman who founded the Union Chimique Belge chemical company
Ewert Janssen (died c. 1692), Danish architect
Famke Janssen (born 1964), Dutch actress, director, screenwriter and fashion model
Frances Janssen (1926–2008), American baseball pitcher
Georges Janssen (1892–1941), Belgian lawyer, civil servant and governor of the National Bank of Belgium 1938–41
Gerard Janssen (born 1946), Dutch-born jeweller, watchmaker and politician in British Columbia
Gheerart Janssen (fl. 1612–1623), sculptor working in Jacobean England, son of Gheerart Janssen the elder
Gheerart Janssen the elder (died 1611), Dutch sculptor who operated a monument workshop in Elizabethan and Jacobean England
Guus Janssen (born 1951), Dutch pianist and composer of contemporary music
Henk Janssen (1890–1969), Dutch tug of war competitor
Henry J. Janssen (1876–19??), American (Wisconsin) politician
Herbert Janssen (1892–1965), German operatic baritone
Horst Janssen (1929–1995), German draftsman, printmaker, poster artist and illustrator
Horst-Janssen-Museum
 (1937–2008), Dutch jazz drummer
Inge Janssen (born 1989), Dutch rower
 (born 1963), Dutch classical pianist
Jan Janssen (born 1940), Dutch road bicycle racer, Tour de France winner 1968
Jan Janssen (gymnast) (1885–1953), Dutch Olympic gymnast
Jan Janssen (ice hockey) (born 1952), American-Dutch ice hockey player
Jann-Peter Janssen (1945-2022), German politician
Jarno Janssen (born 2000), Dutch footballer
 (1940–1986), French cameraman and documentary film maker
Jeannette Janssen, Dutch-Canadian mathematician
Johannes Janssen (1829–1891), German historian and priest
John Janssen (1835–1913), German-born American Roman Catholic bishop in Illinois
Jules Janssen (1824–1907), French astronomer (see Pierre Jansen)
Julia Janssen (1900–1982), German stage and film actress
Karl Janssen (1855–1927), German Baroque revival sculptor
Kaylene Janssen (born 1968), Australian football midfielder
Maarten Janssen (born 1962), Dutch economist 
Madison Janssen (born 1994), Australian cyclist
Marco Janssen (born 1969), Dutch econometrist
Mark Janssen (born 1992), Dutch football striker
Martine Janssen (born 1977), Dutch breaststroke swimmer
Miguel Janssen (born 1970), Dutch-Aruban sprinter
Olaf Janßen (born 1966), German football midfielder and manager
Patrick Janssen (born 1987), Canadian curler 
Paul Janssen (1926–2003), Belgian physician and founder of Janssen Pharmaceutica
Dr. Paul Janssen Award for Biomedical Research
Paula Janssen (born 1996), Brazilian drummer for Quimere
Peter Janssen (1844–1908), German historical painter
Pierre Janssen (also Jules Janssen; 1824–1907), French astronomer, Named after him:
Janssen (lunar crater) and Janssen (Martian crater)
Janssen Medal (French Academy of Sciences), an astrophysics award
Janssen Peak, Antarctic mountain
Janssen revolver, camera that originated chronophotography
Ray Janssen (born 1937), American (Nebraska) politician
René Janssen (born 1959), Dutch nanotechnologist
Richard Janssen (born 1961), Dutch blues rock musician, leader of the band Fatal Flowers
Rik Janssen (born 1957), Dutch Socialist Party politician
Roel Janssen (born 1990), Dutch football defender
Roger Janssen (born 1977), Belgian darts player
Ronald Janssen (born 1971), Belgian serial killer
Ruud Janssen (born 1959), Dutch Fluxus and mail artist
 (born 1971), Dutch chess player
Simon Janssen (born 2000), Dutch footballer
Sjoerd Janssen (born 1984), Dutch electronic dance musician, half of Showtek
Sjef Janssen (born 1950), Dutch equestrian and dressage coach
Sjefke Janssen (1919–2014), Dutch road bicycle racer
Stephen Janssen, 4th Baronet (died 1777), English Member of Parliament and Lord Mayor of London
Stephen Vost Janssen (1879–1945), Australian violin and viola player
Ted Janssen (1936–2017), Dutch physicist
Theo Janssen (born 1981), Dutch football midfielder
Theodore Janssen (c. 1658–1748), French-born English baronet and financier
Tim Janssen (born 1986), Dutch football striker
Tiny Janssen (born 1960s), Dutch sidecar cross rider
Travis Janssen, American college baseball coach
Vincent Janssen (born 1994), Dutch  football striker
Walter Janssen (1887–1976), German film actor
Werner Janssen (1899-1990), American conductor, composer and film score composer
Werner Janssen (philosopher) (born 1944), Dutch/German philosopher, Germanist, author and poet
Willem Janssen (footballer, born 1880) (1880–1976), Dutch footballer
Willem Janssen (footballer, born 1986), Dutch footballer
Willy Janssen (born 1960), Dutch footballer
Wouter Janssen (born 1982), Dutch electronic dance musician, half of Showtek
Zacharias Janssen (1585–before 1632), Dutch spectacle-maker, co-inventor of the telescope and the compound microscope

See also 
Geneviève Janssen-Pevtschin (1915–2011), Belgian lawyer and first female magistrate in Belgium

References

Dutch-language surnames
Patronymic surnames
Surnames from given names